Kaio or KAIO may refer to:

Fictional entities 
 The Kaiō, gods of the fictional Dragon Ball universe
 The Kaiōshin, upper-level gods of the Dragon Ball universe
 Michiru Kaioh, a central character of the Sailor Moon meta-series
 Kaioh, a central antagonist in Fist of the North Star
 Kaio, a monster and star system in the 2009 RPG video game Spectrobes: Origins

People 
 Chōgorō Kaionji (1901–1977), Japanese author noted for historical fiction novels
 Kaiō Hiroyuki (born 1972), sumo wrestler
 Kaio de Almeida (born 1984), Brazilian swimmer
 Kaio Felipe Gonçalves (born 1987), Brazilian footballer
 Kaio Mendes (born 1995), Brazilian footballer
 Kaio Jorge (born 2002), Brazilian footballer

Other uses 
 KAIO (FM), a radio station (90.5 FM) licensed to serve Idaho Falls, Idaho, United States
 KWKK, a radio station (100.9 FM) licensed to serve Russellville, Arkansas, United States, which held the call sign KAIO-FM from 1984 to 1990
 Atlantic Municipal Airport (ICAO code KAIO)

See also 
 Kayo (disambiguation)
 Kajo (disambiguation)